France competed at the 2000 Summer Olympics in Sydney, Australia. 336 competitors, 211 men and 125 women, took part in 196 events in 28 sports.

Medalists

Archery

Sebastian Flute performed better in 2000 than he had in 1996, but still couldn't match the gold medal he had won in 1992.  Jocelyn de Grandis was the only other French archer to win a match.

Men

Women

Athletics

This was the first time since 1936 that France failed to win a single Olympic medal in athletics.

Men's track

Men's field

Women's track

Women's field

Combined events
Decathlon

Heptathlon

Badminton

Men's singles

Women's singles

Basketball

Men's team Roster
 Jim Bilba
 Yann Bonato
 Makan Dioumassi
 Fabien Dubos
 Laurent Foirest
 Thierry Gadou
 David Gauthier
 Cyril Julian
 Crawford Palmer
 Laurent Pluvy
 Antoine Rigaudeau
 Stéphane Risacher
 Dwayne Scholten
 Laurent Sciarra
 Moustapha Sonko
 Frédéric Weis

Women's Team Roster
 Nicole Antibe
 Lucienne Berthieu
 Johanna Boutet
 Sabine Falcoz
 Isabelle Fijalkowski
 Edwige Lawson
 Sandra Le Drean
 Nathalie Lesdema
 Isabelle Marcin
 Catherine Melain
 Laëtitia Moussard
 Audrey Sauret
 Laure Savasta
 Yannick Souvré
 Dominique Tonnerre
 Stéphanie Vivenot

Teams' results

Beach volleyball

Boxing

Canoeing

Slalom

Sprint

Cycling

Cross Country

Road Cycling
Men

Women

Track Cycling
Sprint

Pursuit

Time trial

Points race

Keirin

Omnium

Diving

France entered nine diving events and had two top 10 finishes.
Men

Women

Equestrian

Eventing

Jumping

Fencing

Sixteen fencers, eleven men and five women, represented France in 2000.

Men

Women

Gymnastics

Men
Team

Individual events

Women
Team

Individual events

Handball

Men's roster
 Andrej Golic
 Bertrand Gille
 Bruno Martini
 Cédric Burdet
 Christian Gaudin
 Didier Dinart
 Grégory Anquetil
 Guéric Kervadec
 Guillaume Gille
 Jackson Richardson
 Jérôme Fernandez
 Marc Wiltberger
 Olivier Girault
 Patrick Cazal
 Stéphane Joulin

Women's roster
 Christelle Joseph-Mathieu
 Sonia Cendier Ajaguin
 Isabelle Wendling
 Joanne Dudziak
 Laïsa Lerus
 Leïla Lejeune-Duchemann
 Myriam Korfanty
 Nathalie Selambarom
 Nodjialem Myaro
 Raphaëlle Tervel
 Sandrine Delerce
 Stéphanie Cano
 Stéphanie Ludwig
 Valérie Nicolas
 Véronique Pecqueux-Rolland

Teams' results

Judo

Men's Competition

Women's Competition

Modern pentathlon

Rhythmic gymnastics

Individual

Team

Rowing

Men

Women

Sailing

France competed in six of the Sailing events at the Sydney Olympics.
Individual events

Men's Soling

Shooting

Men

Women

Swimming

Men

Women

Synchronized swimming

Table tennis

Singles

Doubles

Taekwondo

Tennis

Men's singles

Men's doubles

Women's singles

Women's doubles

Trampolining

Triathlon

France's competitors at the first Olympic triathlon included twins Beatrice Mouthon and Isabelle Mouthon-Michellys.  Isabelle was one of the three French triathletes to place in the top eight.

Weightlifting

Men

Women

Wrestling

See also
France at the 2000 Summer Paralympics

Notes

Wallechinsky, David (2004). The Complete Book of the Summer Olympics (Athens 2004 Edition). Toronto, Canada. . 
International Olympic Committee (2001). The Results. Retrieved 12 November 2005.
Sydney Organising Committee for the Olympic Games (2001). Official Report of the XXVII Olympiad Volume 1: Preparing for the Games. Retrieved 20 November 2005.
Sydney Organising Committee for the Olympic Games (2001). Official Report of the XXVII Olympiad Volume 2: Celebrating the Games. Retrieved 20 November 2005.
Sydney Organising Committee for the Olympic Games (2001). The Results. Retrieved 20 November 2005.
International Olympic Committee Web Site

References

Nations at the 2000 Summer Olympics
2000
Olympics